Choi Phillip, born Choi Pil-soon (born 18 August 1979) is a South Korean actor.

Filmography

Television series

Film

Variety show

Theater

References

External links
  
 
 Choi Phillip Fan Cafe at Daum
 
 
 

1979 births
Living people
South Korean male film actors
South Korean male television actors
South Korean male stage actors
People from Seoul
Republic of Korea Marine Corps personnel